"Mr. Dieingly Sad" is a 1966 song by the Critters. It was written by Don Ciccone, who also provides the lead vocals. The song was the second of two singles released from their album Younger Girl, the other being the title track.

"Mr. Dieingly Sad" reached number 17 in both the United States and Canada to become the group's most successful record.

Chart history

References

External links
 

1966 songs
1966 singles

Song recordings produced by Artie Ripp